Expleuracanthus is a genus of xenacanthidan shark. It was erected by Hayler in 1969 as a replacement for Pleuracanthus, which had priority as a name for a genus of beetles. It is considered to be dubious due to it being based on non-diagnostic remains. It is probably a junior synonym of Triodus or Xenacanthus.

References 

Prehistoric cartilaginous fish genera
Permian cartilaginous fish